The pouched gerbil (Desmodilliscus braueri) is a species of rodent in the family Muridae.  It is the only species in the genus Desmodilliscus and the subtribe Desmodilliscina.

It is found across western Africa from Mauritania east to Sudan. Its natural habitat is dry savanna.

This species is probably the smallest of the familia Muridae. It weighs 6 to 14 grams, its length is 4 to 8 cm without the shorter, poorly haired tail.

References

Resources
 Granjon, L. 2004. Desmodilliscus braueri. 2006 IUCN Red List of Threatened Species. Downloaded on 19 July 2007.

Gerbils
Rodents of Africa
Mammals described in 1916
Taxonomy articles created by Polbot